Omladinski košarkaški klub Beograd, commonly referred to as OKK Beograd, is a men's professional basketball club based in Belgrade, Serbia. They are currently competing in the Basketball League of Serbia. It is part of the multi-sports Belgrade-based sport club OSD Beograd. The club is the league affiliate of Mega Basket.

The club was founded in 1945 as KK Metalac. In 1950, the club changed its name to KK BSK, and then in 1958 to OKK Beograd, which it keeps to this day. The OKK Beograd squads have won 4 National League championships. They have played three different National League since 1945, including the Yugoslav First Federal League (1945–1992), the First League of Serbia and Montenegro (1992–2006), and the Serbian League (2006 onward). They have also won 3 National Cup titles.

The club has its own Hall of Fame. The members are Radivoj Korać, Slobodan Gordić, Bogomir Rajković, Trajko Rajković, Miodrag Nikolić, Milorad Erkić, and Borislav Stanković. Several members of the club have been inducted into the FIBA Hall of Fame, including player Korać, coach Aleksandar Nikolić and contributors Radomir Šaper and Stanković. Stanković and Korać are members of the Basketball Hall of Fame.

History
OKK Beograd made most of its achievements during a so-called 'golden era' - a period between 1957 and 1965. The key players of this generation were Radivoj Korać, Slobodan Gordić, Bogomir Rajković, Trajko Rajković, Miodrag Nikolić and Milorad Erkić who would later be the coach of the women's squad, and longtime coordinator of the OKK youth program. They developed under the guidance of coaches Borislav Stanković and Aleksandar Nikolić and team director Radomir Šaper, and went on to win six national trophies and achieve high results in European competitions. In less than a decade, OKK Beograd won four Yugoslav League championships; in 1958, 1960, 1963 and 1964, accompanied by two Yugoslav Cups in 1960 and 1962. The club also reached the semifinals of a European Champions Cup on three occasions, but failed to reach the finals, losing to Academic Sofia in 1959, Spartak Brno in 1964 and Real Madrid in 1965. After 1965, the core of the team went abroad and the results dropped. However, the club did reach the finals of the first-ever Korać Cup in 1972 but lost to another Yugoslav club, Cibona (known at the time as Lokomotiva). Although OKK Beograd remained among the top Serbian and Yugoslav teams, the next trophy was not won until 1993, with the victory in the Yugoslav Cup.

On June 14, 2018, the club signed a contract on sports and technical cooperation with Adriatic League team Mega Basket.

Sponsorship naming
The club has had several denominations through the years due to its sponsorship:
 Beko Beograd: 1974–1979
 InvestEksport Beograd: 1993–1994

Logos

Home arenas 
 Šumice Hall
 Radivoj Korać Hall (2016–present)
 Mega Factory Hall (2018–present)

Players

Current roster

Head coaches 

  Mioljub Denić (1946–1948)
  Radomir Putnik (1949)
  Mihajlo Krnić (1950–1951)
  Aleksandar Nikolić (1952)
  Strahinja Alagić (1953)
  Borislav Stanković (1954–1961)
  Aleksandar Nikolić (1962–1963)
  Borislav Stanković (1964–1965)
  Slobodan Ivković (1966–1967)
  Todor Lazić (1967–1968)
  Borivoje Cenić (1968–1969)
  Borislav Stanković (1969–1970)
  Borivoje Cenić (1970–1971)
  Branislav Rajačić (1971)
  Borivoje Cenić (1971–1972)
  Todor Lazić (1972–1975)
  Branislav Rajačić (1975–1979)
  Slobodan Ivković (1979–1980)
  Branislav Rajačić (1980)
  Slobodan Ivković (1980–1981)
  Petar Marković (1981)
  Slobodan Ivković (1981–1982)
  Duško Vujošević (1982–1983)
  Vojislav Vezović (1983–1984)
  Dragoljub Pljakić (1984–1986)
  Životije Ranković (1986–1987)
  Zdravko Rajačić (1987–1989)
  Veselin Matić (1989–1990)
  Marijan Novović (1990–1991)
  Gordan Todorović (1991–1992)
  Vojislav Vezović (1992)
  Rajko Žižić (1992–1994)
  Gordan Todorović (1994)
  Igor Kokoškov (1994–1995) 
  Ivan Jeremić (1995) 
  Zoran Prelević (1995–1996) 
  Slobodan Nikolić (1996–1999)
  Vladimir Jokanović (1999–2001)
  Predrag Jaćimović (2001–2002)
  Nenad Vučinić (2002–2003)
  Jovica Antonić (2003)
  Luka Pavićević (2003–2004)
  Dejan Mijatović (2004–2006)
  Slobodan Nikolić (2006–2007)
  Marko Ičelić (2007–2011)
  Vlade Đurović (2011–2012)
  Srđan Jeković (2012–2013)
  Vlade Đurović (2013)
  Milovan Stepandić (2013–2015)
  Vlade Đurović (2015–2016)
  Darko Kostić (2016–2018)
  Branislav Vićentić (2018–2019)
  Branko Milisavljević (2019–2020)
  Branislav Ratkovica (2020–2021)
  Vasilije Budimić  (2021–2022)
  Vule Avdalović (2022–present)

Hall of Famers, greatest players and contributors

Naismith Memorial Basketball Hall of Fame

FIBA Hall of Fame

FIBA Order of Merit recipients

FIBA's 50 Greatest Players

50 Greatest EuroLeague Contributors

Season-by-season

Trophies and awards

Trophies 
 Yugoslav League (defunct)
Winners (4): 1958, 1960, 1963, 1964
 Yugoslav Cup (defunct)
Winners (3): 1960, 1962, 1992–93
 FIBA Korać Cup (defunct)
Runners-up (1): 1972

Awards 
 BLS First League MVP
  Andrija Bojić (1) – 2013–14
  Vuk Malidžan (1) – 2014–15

Yugoslav League Top Scorer
  Radivoj Korać (7) – 1957, 1958, 1960, 1962, 1963, 1964, 1965

Notable players

1940s
  Dragan Godžić

1950s
  Aleksandar Nikolić
  Milorad Erkić
  Bogomir Rajković

1960s
  Slobodan Gordić
  Radivoj Korać 
  Miodrag Nikolić
  Trajko Rajković
  Miloš Bojović
  Zvonimir Petričević
  Zoran Marojević
  Bogdan Tanjević

1970s
  Žarko Knežević
  Rajko Žižić
  Branko Vukićević

1980s
  Danko Cvjetičanin
  Zoran Sretenović
  Dragan Todorić

1990s
  Zoran Jovanović
  Nebojša Zorkić
  Zoran Radović

2000s
  Paul Henare
  Miloš Borisov
  Aleksandar Glintić
  Vladimir Micov

2010s
  Aleksej Nešović
  Karlo Matković
  Kimani Ffriend
  Aleksa Avramović
  Andrija Bojić 
  Vuk Malidžan

2020s
  Nikola Đurišić

International record

References

External links
Official website

 
Basketball teams in Yugoslavia
Basketball teams in Belgrade
Basketball teams established in 1945